Geechee is a suspended American supernatural thriller film written and directed by DuBois Ashong. Andrea Riseborough was set to star. Jamie Foxx serves as a producer on the film.

Filming began in August 2020, but was halted in September.

Cast
 Andrea Riseborough as Wren
 Amin Joseph
 Ebon Moss-Bachrach
 Antoinette Crowe-Legacy as Tracey
 Gavin Warren as Axel
 Victoria Hill
 Starletta DuPois
 Judith Scott

Production
In November 2019, it was announced Andrea Riseborough had joined the cast of the film, with DuBois Ahsong directing from a screenplay he wrote. In August 2020, Andrea Riseborough, Amin Joseph, Ebon Moss-Bachrach, Antoinette Crowe-Legacy, Gavin Warren, Victoria Hill, Starletta DuPois and Judith Scott joined the cast of the film, with Jamie Foxx serving as a producer.

Filming
Principal photography began in the Dominican Republic in August 2020. Production was initially set to begin in March 2020, but was delayed due to the COVID-19 pandemic. In September, production was halted indefinitely when a crew member got injured after the crew's convoy was fired upon several times by Dominican police. Apparently, the incident took place due to a case of mistaken identity.

References

External links
 

2020s unfinished films
American supernatural thriller films
Films shot in the Dominican Republic
Unreleased American films